Salles-la-Source is a commune in the Aveyron department in southern France.

The Rodez-Marcillac Airport is located in Salles-la-Source.

Population

See also
Communes of the Aveyron department

References

Communes of Aveyron
Aveyron communes articles needing translation from French Wikipedia